Swainsona is a large genus of flowering plants native to Australasia. There are 85 species, all but one of which are endemic to Australia.

A member of the family Fabaceae (legumes), it is most closely related to the New Zealand genera Montigena (scree pea), Clianthus (kakabeak), and Carmichaelia (New Zealand broom).

Swainsona is named after English botanist Isaac Swainson.

A few species are known to produce swainsonine, a phytotoxin harmful to livestock (see Locoweed).  In Australia, animals intoxicated with swainsonine are said to be pea struck.

Selected species
Swainsona acuticarinata (A.T.Lee) Joy Thomps.
Swainsona adenophylla J.M.Black
Swainsona affinis (A.T.Lee) Joy Thomps.
Swainsona beasleyana F.Muell.
Swainsona behriana F.Muell. ex J.M.Black
Swainsona brachycarpa Benth.
Swainsona bracteata (Maiden & Betche) Joy Thomps.
Swainsona burkei F.Muell. ex Benth.
Swainsona burkittii F.Muell. ex Benth.
Swainsona cadellii F.Muell. ex C.Moore & Betche
Swainsona calcicola Joy Thomps.
Swainsona campestris J.M.Black
Swainsona campylantha F.Muell.
Swainsona canescens (Benth.) F.Muell.
Swainsona colutoides F.Muell.
Swainsona complanata Joy Thomps.
Swainsona concinna F.M.Bailey
Swainsona cornuta Joy Thomps.
Swainsona coronillifolia Salisb.
Swainsona cyclocarpa F.Muell.
Swainsona decurrens A.T.Lee
Swainsona dictyocarpa J.M.Black
Swainsona disjuncta Joy Thomps.
Swainsona ecallosa Sprague
Swainsona elegans A.T.Lee
Swainsona elegantoides (A.T.Lee) Joy Thomps.
Swainsona eremaea Joy Thomps.
Swainsona extrajacens Joy Thomps.
Swainsona fissimontana J.M.Black
Swainsona flavicarinata J.M.Black
Swainsona formosa (G. Don) Joy Thomps. – Sturt's Desert Pea
Swainsona forrestii F.Muell. ex A.T.Lee
Swainsona fragilis F.M.Bailey
Swainsona fraseri Benth.
Swainsona fuscoviridis Joy Thomps.
Swainsona galegifolia (Andrews) R.Br.
Swainsona gracilis Benth.
Swainsona greyana Lindl.
Swainsona halophila Joy Thomps.
Swainsona incei W.R.Price
Swainsona kingii F.Muell.
Swainsona lessertiifolia DC.
Swainsona monticola A.Cunn. ex Benth.
Swainsona procumbens (F.Muell.) F.Muell.
Swainsona sejuncta Joy Thomps.
Swainsona stenodonta

References

 
Flora of Australasia
Fabaceae genera